Clubhouse Detectives is a 1996 American family adventure mystery film. It was written and directed by Eric Hendershot. It follows the story of two young brothers (Billy and Kade Ruckman) who witness their next door neighbor, Michael Chambers, murder Marcela Janowitz. When they fail to convince their mother of what happened they enlist the help of their friends, Jimmy, Eddie, and J.J., in a bid to find the body and expose the truth. It was released in the United States in 1996.

Cast
 Michael Ballam as Michael Chambers
 Michael Galeota as Billy Ruckman
 Jimmy Galeota as Kade Ruckman
 Suzanne Barnes as Vicky Ruckman
 Christopher Ball as Eddie Balser
 Thomas Hobson as Jimmy
 Alex Miranda as J.J. Jimenez
 Liliana Cabal as News Media (as Lillian Cabal)
 James Claffin as Harvey Lynch
 Thom Dillon as Policeman
 Alice Harris (credited Alisa Harris) as Marcela Janowitz
 Carolyn Hurlburt as Theatre Woman
 Nancy Peterson as Newscast (as Nancy Riddle)
 Alan Williams as Orchestra Conductor (uncredited)

External links
 

1996 films
American mystery films
1990s English-language films
1990s American films